The Thompson School is a historic school building on Prospect Street in Webster, Massachusetts.  The -story English Revival brick building was constructed in 1912–13 to a design by Walter F. Fontaine, a leading architect from nearby Woonsocket, Rhode Island.  It was named for Dr. John A. Thompson, who served on the local school committee from 1907 until his death in 1916.

The school building was listed on the National Register of Historic Places in 1989.  It has been converted to residential use.

See also
National Register of Historic Places listings in Worcester County, Massachusetts

References

School buildings on the National Register of Historic Places in Massachusetts
Buildings and structures in Webster, Massachusetts
National Register of Historic Places in Worcester County, Massachusetts